Mike Gilligan is a retired American ice hockey coach. He was the head coach at Vermont from 1983 through 2003 and later became an assistant with the UVM women's team for seven more seasons before retiring in 2014.

Career

Playing
Mike Gilligan started as a defenseman for Salem State for three seasons, serving as captain and earning All-American honors in the final two before moving onto a brief minor league career in the early 1970s.

Coaching
Gilligan returned to Salem State in 1975 to serve as head coach for his alma mater. Playing in ECAC Hockey's now defunct Division II league, Salem State became a powerhouse under Gilligan, winning at least 20 games in each of his six seasons behind the bench. Their best finish came in 1979 when they finished 4th in the NCAA Division II Men's Ice Hockey Championship. After the 1980-81 campaign Gilligan accepted an offer to serve as Tim Taylor's assistant at Yale. Two years later Taylor took a hiatus from the University to serve as an assistant for Team USA at the 1984 Winter Olympics, leaving the Bulldogs in the hands of Gilligan for the 1983–84 season. Gilligan acquitted himself by getting Yale to a 12-13-1 record and after the conclusion of the season was chosen to replace Jim Cross at Vermont

Gilligan's first season with the Catamounts was a disappointing, finishing with an 8-21-0 record, but by the end of his second season he had gotten them back on track, winning 17 games. over the next 12 seasons Vermont would post winning records 10 times and made their first NCAA tournament berth in 1988. Gillian's best season came in 1995–96 when he won Vermont's it's only Regular Season Championship with a 27-win season and saw the Catamounts make the Frozen Four for the first time, finishing 3rd in the 1996 tournament behind the strong play of future NHLers Martin St. Louis and Tim Thomas.

In the 1999–00 season both Gilligan and Vermont were tarnished as a result of a hazing scandal that caused the University to cancel its season after only seventeen games and while it did not lead to Gilligan's dismissal he would never again field a winning team, resigning from his post after the 2002–03 season, one win shy of the school record.

In addition to coaching hockey at the University of Vermont, Gilligan served as the head coach of the catamount golf team from 1993 through 2009.

Women's Teams
After leaving Vermont Gilligan became an assistant for the US Women's National Team for over two years, helping the team to win gold at the 2005 IIHF Women's World Championship and bronze at Torino the following year. Gilligan returned to Vermont in the fall of 2006 as an assistant for the women's team and remained in that position until his retirement in 2014.

Honors
Gilligan was inducted into the Salem State Athletic Hall of Fame in 1986 and was co-ECAC Hockey Coach of the Year with Bill Cleary two years later. After retiring as head coach Gilligan was named the 2005 recipient of the John MacInnes Award, the 2008 recipient of the Parker-York Award and was inducted into the Massachusetts Hockey hall of Fame in 2010

Head coaching record

* Vermont canceled the 1999-2000 season after only 17 games due to a hazing scandal.

See also
List of college men's ice hockey coaches with 400 wins

References

External links

American ice hockey coaches
Ice hockey coaches from Massachusetts
Living people
Olympic bronze medalists for the United States in ice hockey
Vermont Catamounts men's ice hockey coaches
Yale Bulldogs men's ice hockey coaches
Year of birth missing (living people)
American men's ice hockey defensemen
Ice hockey players from Massachusetts
Salem State Vikings men's ice hockey coaches